The Manatee County Courthouse, built in 1913, is a historic courthouse building located at 1115 Manatee Avenue, West, in Bradenton, Florida. On June 11, 1998, it was added to the National Register of Historic Places.

See also
 Manatee County courthouses (disambiguation)

References

External links 

 Florida's Historic Courthouses

Bradenton, Florida
County courthouses in Florida
National Register of Historic Places in Manatee County, Florida
Buildings and structures in Manatee County, Florida
Government buildings completed in 1913
1913 establishments in Florida
Courthouses on the National Register of Historic Places in Florida